Kathreen Aziz Khavari (born June 23, 1983) is an American actress, writer, and producer who first gained attention when her sketch Brain of Terror, in which she played eleven different characters, went viral after it was featured on Upworthy. She is best known for her role as Patricia on HBO's Insecure, Samantha on HBO's Big Little Lies, and for voicing Ms. Marvel in various Marvel Entertainment animated series and video games.

Early life
Khavari was born and raised in Oakland, California to Iranian immigrant parents. After graduating from Skyline High School, she attended the University of California, Berkeley, studying public health, then later earned a Master's degree from the London School of Hygiene & Tropical Medicine in Control of Infectious Diseases.

Career
Khavari realized her childhood passion of acting was unwavering, and upon returning home from London, she took small acting jobs while working in the public health field. She made her off-Broadway debut in “You Are Dead, You Are Here” at the Here Arts Center in New York. 

In response to Trump's "Muslim Ban," Khavari made headlines at the premier of Big Little Lies when she wore a dress that read "My Iranian Immigrant Mother Teaches Your Kids How to Read".

Khavari's satirical sketches, which she posted to her YouTube channel Brain of Terror, touched on various social justice issues including gun control, Islamophobia, women's reproductive rights, and police brutality against black men in America.

In 2022, she was the voice of Badyah Hassan in the Netflix animated series Dead End: Paranormal Park. She was also announced as the voice of a new Transformers robot, Twitch, in the Nickelodeon series Transformers: EarthSpark.

Khavari’s Oakland-based pilot, Embrace, debuted at the 2020 Sundance Film Festival in their Indie Episodic category. The pilot also won the Episodic Pilot Competition Jury Award at SXSW “For its originality of voice, its depiction of characters and relationships that are both enigmatic and appealing, as well as telling an absorbing story in a world unseen on television at the moment.”

Filmography

Film

Television

Video games

References

External links

Living people
American people of Iranian descent
American voice actresses
Writers from Oakland, California
Television producers from California
Actresses from Oakland, California
21st-century American actresses
21st-century American screenwriters
21st-century American women writers
American women television producers
Screenwriters from California
American television actresses
University of California, Berkeley alumni
Alumni of the London School of Hygiene & Tropical Medicine
1983 births